William Kerr is the name of:

Politics and nobility
William Kerr, 1st Earl of Lothian (c. 1605–1675), Scottish nobleman
William Kerr, 2nd Marquess of Lothian (1661–1722), Scottish peer and soldier
William Kerr, 3rd Marquess of Lothian (c. 1690–1767), Scottish nobleman
William Kerr, 4th Marquess of Lothian (1710–1775), also a Member of Parliament
William Kerr, 5th Marquess of Lothian (1737–1815), British soldier and peer
William Kerr, 6th Marquess of Lothian (1763–1824), son of William Kerr, 5th Marquess of Lothian
Sir William Kerr, 3rd Baronet (died 1716), one of the Scottish representatives to the first Parliament of Great Britain
Sir William Kerr, 4th Baronet (died 1741), of the Kerr baronets
Sir William Kerr, 6th Baronet (died 1755), of the Kerr baronets
William Johnson Kerr (1787–1845), political figure in Upper Canada
William G. Kerr (c. 1814–1861), mayor of Hamilton, Ontario, Canada
William Kerr (Canadian politician) (1836–1906), Canadian politician
William Franklin Kerr (1876–1968), journalist and politician in Saskatchewan, Canada
William Kerr (mayor) (1809–1853), mayor of Pittsburgh, Pennsylvania

Military
William Kerr (Royal Navy officer) (born c. 1670), British admiral
William Munro Kerr (1876–1959), British admiral
William Kerr (British Army officer, died 1741), British Army officer, MP for Aberdeen Burghs and Dysart Burghs
William Alexander Kerr (1831–1919), Scottish recipient of the Victoria Cross

Sports
William Kerr (American football) (1914–2005), American football and wrestling coach
Bill Kerr (footballer) (1882–1911), Australian rules footballer
Willie Kerr, Scottish footballer 
Billy Kerr (1945–2012), Irish cyclist
William Kerr (baseball), co-owner of the Pittsburgh Pirates baseball team
Will Kerr (born 1982), American mixed martial artist
Bud Kerr (1916–1964), American football player and coach

Other
William Kerr (gardener) (died 1814), collector of plants in East Asia
William Kerr (journalist) (1812–1859), Scottish-Australian journalist, founder of The Argus
William Kerr (architect) (1836–1911), Irish-American architect
William Kerr (bishop) (1873–1960), Irish Anglican bishop
William Jasper Kerr (1863–1947), president of Oregon State University, 1907–1932
William Alexander Robb Kerr (1875–1945), Canadian academic and president of the University of Alberta
William R. Kerr, professor at Harvard Business School
Bill Kerr (1922–2014), South African-born Australian actor

See also
William Ker (disambiguation)